Şehmus Özer (10 May 1980 – 21 December 2016) was a Turkish professional footballer who played as a forward for Amed SK. On 21 December 2016, Özer was killed in a car accident.

References

1980 births
2016 deaths
Turkish footballers
Malatyaspor footballers
Kayserispor footballers
Gümüşhanespor footballers
Mardinspor footballers
Karşıyaka S.K. footballers
Altay S.K. footballers
Mersin İdman Yurdu footballers
Şanlıurfaspor footballers
Yeni Malatyaspor footballers
Association football forwards
Road incident deaths in Turkey
People from Ergani